In computer science, subnormal numbers are the subset of denormalized numbers (sometimes called denormals) that fill the underflow gap around zero in floating-point arithmetic. Any non-zero number with magnitude smaller than the smallest normal number is subnormal.

 Usage note: in some older documents (especially standards documents such as the initial releases of IEEE 754 and the C language), "denormal" is used to refer exclusively to subnormal numbers. This usage persists in various standards documents, especially when discussing hardware that is incapable of representing any other denormalized numbers, but the discussion here uses the term subnormal in line with the 2008 revision of IEEE 754.

In a normal floating-point value, there are no leading zeros in the significand (mantissa); rather, leading zeros are removed by adjusting the exponent (for example, the number 0.0123 would be written as ). Conversely, a denormalized floating point value has a significand with a leading digit of zero. Of these, the subnormal numbers represent values which if normalized would have exponents below the smallest representable exponent (the exponent having a limited range).

The significand (or mantissa) of an IEEE floating-point number is the part of a floating-point number that represents the significant digits. For a positive normalised number it can be represented as m0.m1m2m3...mp−2mp−1 (where m represents a significant digit, and p is the precision) with non-zero m0. Notice that for a binary radix, the leading binary digit is always 1. In a subnormal number, since the exponent is the least that it can be, zero is the leading significant digit (0.m1m2m3...mp−2mp−1), allowing the representation of numbers closer to zero than the smallest normal number. A floating-point number may be recognized as subnormal whenever its exponent is the least value possible.

By filling the underflow gap like this, significant digits are lost, but not as abruptly as when using the flush to zero on underflow approach (discarding all significant digits when underflow is reached). Hence the production of a subnormal number is sometimes called gradual underflow because it allows a calculation to lose precision slowly when the result is small.

In IEEE 754-2008, denormal numbers are renamed subnormal numbers and are supported in both binary and decimal formats. In binary interchange formats, subnormal numbers are encoded with a biased exponent of 0, but are interpreted with the value of the smallest allowed exponent, which is one greater (i.e., as if it were encoded as a 1).  In decimal interchange formats they require no special encoding because the format supports unnormalized numbers directly.

Mathematically speaking, the normalized floating-point numbers of a given sign are roughly logarithmically spaced, and as such any finite-sized normal float cannot include zero. The subnormal floats are a linearly spaced set of values, which span the gap between the negative and positive normal floats.

Background 
Subnormal numbers provide the guarantee that addition and subtraction of floating-point numbers never underflows; two nearby floating-point numbers always have a representable non-zero difference. Without gradual underflow, the subtraction a − b can underflow and produce zero even though the values are not equal. This can, in turn, lead to division by zero errors that cannot occur when gradual underflow is used.

Subnormal numbers were implemented in the Intel 8087 while the IEEE 754 standard was being written. They were by far the most controversial feature in the K-C-S format proposal that was eventually adopted, but this implementation demonstrated that subnormal numbers could be supported in a practical implementation. Some implementations of floating-point units do not directly support subnormal numbers in hardware, but rather trap to some kind of software support. While this may be transparent to the user, it can result in calculations that produce or consume subnormal numbers being much slower than similar calculations on normal numbers.

Performance issues 
Some systems handle subnormal values in hardware, in the same way as normal values. Others leave the handling of subnormal values to system software ("assist"), only handling normal values and zero in hardware. Handling subnormal values in software always leads to a significant decrease in performance. When subnormal values are entirely computed in hardware, implementation techniques exist to allow their processing at speeds comparable to normal numbers. However, the speed of computation remains significantly reduced on many modern x86 processors; in extreme cases, instructions involving subnormal operands may take as many as 100 additional clock cycles, causing the fastest instructions to run as much as six times slower.

This speed difference can be a security risk.  Researchers showed that it provides a timing side channel that allows a malicious web site to extract page content from another site inside a web browser.

Some applications need to contain code to avoid subnormal numbers, either to maintain accuracy, or in order to avoid the performance penalty in some processors. For instance, in audio processing applications, subnormal values usually represent a signal so quiet that it is out of the human hearing range. Because of this, a common measure to avoid subnormals on processors where there would be a performance penalty is to cut the signal to zero once it reaches subnormal levels or mix in an extremely quiet noise signal. Other methods of preventing subnormal numbers include adding a DC offset, quantizing numbers, adding a Nyquist signal, etc. Since the SSE2 processor extension, Intel has provided such a functionality in CPU hardware, which rounds subnormal numbers to zero.

Disabling subnormal floats at the code level

Intel SSE 

It is known to work on Mac OS X since at least 2006.

#include <fenv.h>
#pragma STDC FENV_ACCESS ON
// Sets DAZ and FTZ, clobbering other CSR settings.
// See https://opensource.apple.com/source/Libm/Libm-287.1/Source/Intel/, fenv.c and fenv.h.
fesetenv(FE_DFL_DISABLE_SSE_DENORMS_ENV);
// fesetenv(FE_DFL_ENV) // Disable both, clobbering other CSR settings.

For other x86-SSE platforms where the C library has not yet implemented this flag, the following may work:

#include <xmmintrin.h>
_mm_setcsr(_mm_getcsr() | 0x0040);  // DAZ
_mm_setcsr(_mm_getcsr() | 0x8000);  // FTZ
_mm_setcsr(_mm_getcsr() | 0x8040);  // Both
_mm_setcsr(_mm_getcsr() & ~0x8040); // Disable both

The  and  macros wrap a more readable interface for the code above.
// To enable DAZ
#include <pmmintrin.h>
_MM_SET_DENORMALS_ZERO_MODE(_MM_DENORMALS_ZERO_ON);
// To enable FTZ
#include <xmmintrin.h>
_MM_SET_FLUSH_ZERO_MODE(_MM_FLUSH_ZERO_ON);

Most compilers will already provide the previous macro by default, otherwise the following code snippet can be used (the definition for FTZ is analogous):
#define _MM_DENORMALS_ZERO_MASK   0x0040
#define _MM_DENORMALS_ZERO_ON     0x0040
#define _MM_DENORMALS_ZERO_OFF    0x0000

#define _MM_SET_DENORMALS_ZERO_MODE(mode) _mm_setcsr((_mm_getcsr() & ~_MM_DENORMALS_ZERO_MASK) | (mode))
#define _MM_GET_DENORMALS_ZERO_MODE()                (_mm_getcsr() &  _MM_DENORMALS_ZERO_MASK)

The default denormalization behavior is mandated by the ABI, and therefore well-behaved software should save and restore the denormalization mode before returning to the caller or calling code in other libraries.

ARM 
For the scalar FPU and in the AArch64 SIMD, the flush-to-zero behavior is optional and controlled by the  bit of the control register – FPSCR in Arm32 and FPCR in AArch64.

Some ARM processors have hardware handling of subnormals.

See also 
Logarithmic number system

References

Further reading 

 See also various papers on William Kahan's web site  for examples of where subnormal numbers help improve the results of calculations.

Computer arithmetic
Articles with example C code